Keijuro Matsui (popularly known as KJ) (born October 16, 1985) is a Japanese professional basketball player for the Toyama Grouses of the B.League. He is a former guard for the Columbia Lions basketball team at Columbia University and the first Japanese native basketball player in NCAA Division I history. Matsui also played in the 2005 Nike Hoop Summit for the World Select Team, only the second Japanese to do so.  In the summit he scored seven points in 11 minutes. Following his collegiate career, he relocated to his native country, where he has played ever since.

Career statistics 

|-
| align="left" |  2009-10
| align="left" | Hokkaido
| 41 ||    || 17.05 || .413 || .399 || .757 || 1.78 || 0.44 || 0.27 || 0 ||  6.76
|-
| align="left" | 2010-11
| align="left" | Hitachi
| 36 ||    || 22.17 || .417 || .349 || .800 || 1.58 || 0.81 || 0.28 || 0.05 || 8.42
|-
|  align="left"  style="background-color:#afe6ba; border: 1px solid gray" |  2011-12†
| align="left" | Toyota
| 42 ||    || 18.83 || .449 || .424 || .813 || 1.76 || 0.55 || 0.36 || 0.07 ||  8.69
|-
| align="left" | 2012-13
| align="left" | Toyota
| 42|| || 18.7|| .458||bgcolor="CFECEC"| .494*|| .814|| 2.2|| 0.8|| 0.2|| 0.1|| 9.6 
|-
| align="left" |  2013-14
| align="left" | Toyota
| 54|| || 21.6|| .446|| .408|| .839|| 1.8|| 1.0|| 0.5|| 0.0||  10.7
|-
| align="left" | 2014-15
| align="left" | Toyota
| 54||5 || 22.3|| .406|| .432|| .676|| 2.3|| 1.3|| 0.6|| 0.0||  9.4
|-
| align="left" | 2015-16
| align="left" | Toyota
| 55||13 || 20.8|| .478|| bgcolor="CFECEC"|.449*|| .816|| 1.4|| 1.4|| 0.6|| 0||  11.2 
|-
| align="left" |  2016-17
| align="left" | A Tokyo
|59 ||6 ||16.8 ||.399 ||.395 ||.939 ||1.4 || 0.4||0.2 ||0.1 ||6.1
|-
| align="left" | 2017-18
| align="left" | Mikawa
|55 ||6 ||12.8 ||.440 ||.403 ||.677 ||0.9 ||0.9 ||0.4 ||0.0 || 4.9
|-

References
 KJ Matsui Columbia Lions profile

1985 births
Living people
Alvark Tokyo players
Columbia Lions men's basketball players
Columbia College (New York) alumni
Guards (basketball)
Japanese expatriate basketball people in the United States
Japanese men's basketball players
Kyoto Hannaryz players
Levanga Hokkaido players
SeaHorses Mikawa players
Sun Rockers Shibuya players
Toyama Grouses players